Evie Dominikovic (born 29 May 1980) is a retired Australian tennis player. Her younger sister (by seven years) is the fellow former tennis player Daniella Dominikovic (later Daniella Jeflea). Evie Dominikovic also has a child.

She turned professional in 1997. Her best Grand Slam performance came at the 2001 Australian Open and at the 2002 French Open where she reached the third round.

Her best singles ranking was 64, achieved in September 2001. Dominikovic also played women's doubles; her best doubles ranking was 52, reached in August 2002. In her career, she won one doubles title on the WTA Tour, as well as 12 singles and 15 doubles titles on the ITF Circuit.

WTA career finals

Doubles: 2 (1 title, 1 runner-up)

ITF Circuit finals

Singles: 20 (12–8)

Doubles: 28 (15–13)

External links
 
 
 
 Statistics on Evie Dominikovic
 Australian Open biographical profile

1980 births
Living people
Australian female tennis players
Sportswomen from New South Wales
Grand Slam (tennis) champions in girls' doubles
Australian people of Croatian descent
Tennis players from Sydney
Australian Open (tennis) junior champions
21st-century Australian women